The Liverbirds  were an English all-female rock band from Liverpool, active between 1963 and 1968. The group consisted of vocalist and guitarist Valerie Gell, guitarist and vocalist Pamela Birch, bassist and vocalist Mary McGlory, and drummer Sylvia Saunders. They were one of the very few female bands on the Merseybeat scene, as well as one of the first all-female rock and roll bands in the world. They took their name from the fictional liver bird, which is the symbol of their native Liverpool. They were mostly a cover band, except for three of their songs being written by Pamela Birch.

History
Gell, Saunders, and McGlory formed the band in 1963, along with guitarist Sheila McGlory (Mary's sister) and vocalist Irene Green, both of whom quickly left to join other bands and were replaced by Birch. According to Bruce Eder, the group formed in early 1962 as the Debutones. Irene Green left to join Tiffany's Dimensions and Sheila McGlory to the Demoiselles. They achieved more commercial success in Germany than their native Britain. Early in their career, they followed in the footsteps of fellow Liverpudlians the Beatles and made their way to Hamburg, where they performed at the Star-Club after the Beatles' own tenure and were billed as "the female Beatles". John Lennon of the Beatles infamously told the group that "girls" were unable to play guitars. Regardless, the Liverbirds became one of the top attractions at the Star-Club and they released two albums and several singles on the Club's own label. One of those singles, a cover of Bo Diddley's "Diddley Daddy", reached No. 5 on the German charts. The group broke up in 1968, just after finishing a tour of Japan. They briefly reunited in 1998.

Three members of the band settled in Germany permanently. Saunders moved to Spain, settling in Alicante with her husband, John (died 2 April 2017). Sylvia Saunders is now living in Glasgow. McGlory runs a Hamburg-based company called Ja/Nein Musikverlag ("Yes/No Music Publishing") which she founded with her husband, German songwriter Frank Dostal (died April 2017), who was one of the band's former colleagues from the Star-Club and later vice-chairman of the German performance rights organization GEMA. Birch also settled in Hamburg and worked for many years in the city's clubs. She died at the UKE on 27 October 2009, at the age of 65. Gell, who settled in Munich but later returned to Hamburg, died on 11 December 2016, aged 71.

Members 

 Valerie Gell, vocalist and guitarist (1963–1968, 1998), died 2016
 Mary McGlory, bassist and vocalist (1963–1968, 1998)
 Sylvia Saunders, drummer (1963–1968, 1998)
 Sheila McGlory, guitarist (1963)
 Irene Green, vocalist (1963)
 Pamela Birch, guitarist and vocalist (1963–1968, 1998) (replaced Sheila McGlory and Irene Green), died 2009

Discography

Albums
Star-Club Show 4 (1965)
More of the Liverbirds (1966)

Compilations
From Merseyside to Hamburg - The Complete Star-Club Recordings (2010), Big Beat CDWIKD 290 (features the 29 songs from both studio albums, though not in the order on the albums)

Singles
 "Shop Around "/"It's Got to Be You" (1964 or 1965)
 "Diddley Daddy "/"Leave All Your Loves in the Past" (1965)
 "Peanut Butter"/"Why Do You Hang Around Me" (1965)
 "Loop de Loop"/"Bo Diddley Is a Lover" (1966)

Possible songs
Tablyrics.com lists some songs that are not known outside of the site. Their existence is unknown.
 "The Past"
 "Nobody But You"
 "Baby I Dig Love"
 "Tell Me"

In other media
The story of the Liverbirds is the subject of the 2019 musical, Girls Don't Play Guitars, written by Ian Salmon and directed by Bob Eaton at the Royal Court Theatre, Liverpool. Founding members McGlory and Saunders have been involved with the production and join in the cast on stage for the encore. Also in 2019, The New York Times produced a sixteen-minute documentary about the band called We're Britain's First Female Rock Band. This is Why You Don't Know Us. | 'Almost Famous' by Op-Docs. It featured surviving members Mary McGlory and Sylvia Saunders. 
It is also known as The Other Fab Four.

References

Further reading
Rohkohl, Brigitte: Rock Frauen (Rowohlt 1979), 
Flannery, Joe: Standing in the Wings (The History Press 2018),

External links
 Web.archive.org
 [ Allmusic.com]
 
 

All-female bands
Musical groups established in 1963
Musical groups disestablished in 1968
Beat groups
Musical groups from Liverpool
English rock music groups
British rock and roll music groups
Music in Hamburg